Abdulrahim Abdulhameed (born March 31, 1990) is a male Bahraini Taekwondo practitioner.

At the 2010 Asian Games, Abdulrahim was a win away from securing at least a bronze medal, but with about a minute into his quarterfinal bout against Kim Seong-Ho of South Korea, he began to feel dazed and short of breath while experiencing unbearable pain in his abdomen. He even had trouble standing up by himself, and needed to be stretchered off the playing court and into an ambulance to be rushed to a local hospital. Abdulrahim underwent successful laparoscopic surgery next day to remove some blood that had collected in his abdomen which was causing him severe pain while competing at the Asian Games.

References 

1990 births
Living people
Bahraini male taekwondo practitioners
Asian Games medalists in taekwondo
Taekwondo practitioners at the 2006 Asian Games
Taekwondo practitioners at the 2010 Asian Games
Asian Games bronze medalists for Bahrain
Medalists at the 2006 Asian Games